Minuscule 572 (in the Gregory-Aland numbering), ε 1221 (in the Soden numbering), is a Greek minuscule manuscript of the New Testament, on parchment. Palaeographically it has been assigned to the year 12th century. It was labeled by Scrivener as 480.
The manuscript has not complex contents.

Description 

The codex contains the text of the Gospel of Mark 8:3-9:50 on 19 parchment leaves (size ). The writing is in one column per page, 12 lines per page. After every word there is a dot.

Text 

Aland did not place the text of the codex in any Category.

History 

The manuscript was brought from the Sinai peninsula by Constantin von Tischendorf.

The manuscript was examined and described by Eduard de Muralt (along with the codices 565-566, 568, 570-571, 574, 575, and 1567), who did not examine any of its readings, then by Kurt Treu.

The manuscript belonged to the same codex as 1231, still housed at the Saint Catherine's Monastery (Gr. 194, 58 fol.).

Currently the manuscript is housed at the National Library of Russia (Gr. 91, fol. 19) in Saint Petersburg.

See also 

 List of New Testament minuscules
 Biblical manuscript
 Textual criticism

References

Further reading 

 Constantin von Tischendorf, Notitia editionis codicis Bibliorum Sinaitici (Leipzig, 1860), p. 64.
 Eduard de Muralt, Catalogue des manuscrits grecs de la Bibliothèque Impériale publique (Petersburg 1864),.
 Kurt Treu, Die griechischen Handschriften des Neuen Testaments in der UdSSR; eine systematische Auswertung des Texthandschriften in Leningrad, Moskau, Kiev, Odessa, Tbiblisi und Erevan, Texte und Untersuchungen 91 (Berlin, 1966), pp. 62–62.

External links 
 Image from the codex at the RNB

Greek New Testament minuscules
12th-century biblical manuscripts
National Library of Russia collection